WQBX (104.9 FM) is a radio station licensed to Alma, Michigan broadcasting a hot adult contemporary format.  The station was originally and formerly WFYC-FM.

WQBX is the local affiliate for Detroit Tigers baseball and Michigan Wolverines sports. WQBX also provides coverage of local high school sports. Their broadcast team of Jeff Sommerville and Topher Goggin are three-time recipients of the MAB Broadcast Excellence Award for Play-by-Play Sports.

Sources
Michiguide.com - WQBX History

External links
WQBX 104.9 Facebook
WQBX Online

QBX
Hot adult contemporary radio stations in the United States
Radio stations established in 1964